Idršek (in older sources also Ideršček) is a small dispersed settlement in the hills northeast of Idrija in the traditional Inner Carniola region of Slovenia.

References

External links

Idršek on Geopedia

Populated places in the Municipality of Idrija